Luparense Football Club is an Italian association football in San Martino di Lupari in the Province of Padua. It is the same club that operates the futsal section of the same name.

History
The club was founded in 1933 and refounded in 1952.

It have played as Unione Sportiva Luparense in Serie C and Serie D; currently it plays at the step 7 of the Italian football league system, in the Prima Categoria Veneto Girone F.

The merger
22 June 2015 A.S.D. Radio Birikina (the club have changed its name for sponsorship reasons) merged with A.S.D. Luparense Football Club, the local club of futsal changing its name in the current.

It plays with the team B after the moving of "S.S.D. Atletico San Paolo Padova", now Luparense San Paolo F.C. in the same city.

Colors and badge 
The team's colors are red and blue.

References

External links
Official website of Luparense F.C.

Football clubs in Veneto
Province of Padua
1933 establishments in Italy
Association football clubs established in 1933